Alexis Ponnet (born 9 March 1939 in Brussels) is a former Belgian football referee. Ponnet is best known for supervising two matches in the 1982 FIFA World Cup in Spain and one in the 1986 FIFA World Cup in Mexico. He also refereed the European Cup final in 1987 between Porto and Bayern Munich. He also refereed two UEFA European Football Championship in 1984 and 1988.

In February 1983, Ponnet was rendered unconscious and hospitalized overnight after Saudi Arabian player Jamal Farhan punched him in the head during the World Military Cup between Saudi Arabia and Kuwait. Ponnet had given him a red card minutes earlier. Farhan was subsequently banned from international games for life by FIFA.

References

External links 
 
 

1939 births
Sportspeople from Brussels
Belgian football referees
FIFA World Cup referees
Living people
1982 FIFA World Cup referees
1986 FIFA World Cup referees
UEFA Euro 1984 referees
UEFA Euro 1988 referees